Julián Fernández is the name of:

Julián Fernández (footballer, born 1989), Argentine football centre-back for Messina
Julián Fernández (footballer, born 1995), Argentine football midfielder for Newell's Old Boys
Julián Fernández (footballer, born 2004), Argentine football forward for Vélez Sarsfield
Julián Fernández (baseball), baseball player